This is a list of Serbian Revolutionaries, participants in the Serbian Revolution (1804–1817).

See also

 Serbian revolutionary organizations

References

Sources
 
 
 
 
 
 

 

Revolutionaries
Revolutionaries
Revolutionaries
Revolution